L'Éclipse was a French magazine of the nineteenth century, appearing from 1868 to 1876.  Edited by Francis Polo, L'Éclipse was a showcase for the illustrator André Gill, in which he drew caricatures of his illustrious contemporaries.

Napoleon III disliked the portrait of him drawn by Gill in La Lune.  In December 1867, the journal was censored.  "La Lune will have to undergo an eclipse," an authority commented to Editor Francis Polo when the ban was instituted, unwittingly dubbing Polo's subsequent publication: L'Eclipse, which made its first appearance on 9 August 1868.

L'Éclipse would itself suffer from twenty-two seizures by the law. It consisted only of one page, due to governmental restrictions.

References

External links
 L' Eclipse: journal hebdomadaire politique, satirique et illustré digitized version

1868 establishments in France
1876 disestablishments in France
Defunct magazines published in France
French-language magazines
Satirical magazines published in France
Magazines established in 1868
Magazines disestablished in 1876